Record is the fifth solo studio album by English singer and songwriter Tracey Thorn. It was recorded by Thorn with producer Ewan Pearson and a number of backing musicians, including singers Shura and Corinne Bailey Rae, drummer Stella Mozgawa, bassist Jenny Lee Lindberg, and guitarist Jono Ma. The album released by Merge Records on 2 March 2018 to mostly positive reviews from critics.

Critical reception

Writing for Pitchfork, music journalist Laura Snapes described Record as "one of the defining albums of [Thorn's] 38-year career", while Rolling Stone critic Rob Sheffield said "Thorn's Synth-Pop 'Record' Delivers Sisterly Passion, Wry Wisdom". Robert Christgau wrote in his review for Vice: "Calm, deliberate, undemonstrative, Thorn is a singer some find magical and others prosaic. I've always tended other, but when a 55-year-old wife and mother claims she's recorded 'nine feminist bangers,' I pay attention. And these definitely work up some fairy dust. The beats evoke without mimicking the subtle electro-dance of Thorn and her beatmaking husband Ben Watt's 20th-century band, Everything but the Girl, and in her undemonstrative way, she sequences the catchiest tracks last ['Face' and 'Dancefloor']".

Track listing

Charts

References

External links
 

2018 albums
Tracey Thorn albums
Synth-pop albums by English artists
Merge Records albums